In six-dimensional Euclidean geometry, the quarter 6-cubic honeycomb is a uniform space-filling tessellation (or honeycomb). It has half the vertices of the 6-demicubic honeycomb, and a quarter of the vertices of a 6-cube honeycomb. Its facets are 6-demicubes, stericated 6-demicubes, and {3,3}×{3,3} duoprisms.

Related honeycombs

See also 
Regular and uniform honeycombs in 5-space:
6-cube honeycomb
6-demicube honeycomb
 6-simplex honeycomb
 Truncated 6-simplex honeycomb
 Omnitruncated 6-simplex honeycomb

Notes

References 
 Kaleidoscopes: Selected Writings of H. S. M. Coxeter, edited by F. Arthur Sherk, Peter McMullen, Anthony C. Thompson, Asia Ivic Weiss, Wiley-Interscience Publication, 1995,  
 (Paper 24) H.S.M. Coxeter, Regular and Semi-Regular Polytopes III, [Math. Zeit. 200 (1988) 3-45] See p318 
 

Honeycombs (geometry)
7-polytopes